The Frederick Parkinson House is a historic house located in Wagoner, Oklahoma, United States. It was added to the National Register of Historic Places in 1982.

The house was built in 1897. It was home to Fred Parkinson, a prominent merchant in Wagoner.

Citations

Houses in Wagoner County, Oklahoma
Houses on the National Register of Historic Places in Oklahoma
Houses completed in 1897
National Register of Historic Places in Wagoner County, Oklahoma